Oskar Morawetz,  (January 17, 1917 – June 13, 2007) was a Canadian composer.

Biography
Morawetz was born in Světlá nad Sázavou, Bohemia (now in the Czech Republic). He studied piano and theory in Prague and, following the Nazi takeover of his country in 1938, studied in Vienna and Paris. At the age of 19 he was recommended by George Szell for the assistant conductor's post with the Prague Opera. In 1940 he left Europe for Canada where he began teaching at the Royal Conservatory of Music in 1946, and in 1952 was appointed to the University of Toronto where he was professor of composition until his retirement in 1982. His work was also part of the music event in the art competition at the 1948 Summer Olympics.

In 1971, From the Diary of Anne Frank won a Juno Award for "Best Classical Composition" in 2001. His Concerto for Harp and Orchestra also won a Juno award in 1989. On three occasions, Morawetz was awarded a Canada Council Senior Arts Fellowship (1960, 1967, 1974) for his contribution to Canadian music. In 1987, Morawetz received the Order of Ontario and in 1989 he received the Order of Canada for his "outstanding achievements and service". SOCAN honoured Morawetz in 1994 and in 1999. He was also awarded an honorary diploma from the Royal Conservatory of Music (1998), and the Golden Jubilee Medal (2002)

Citations

External links
 The Official Oskar Morawetz web site
 The Canadian Music Centre
 The Canadian Encyclopedia
 Library and Archives of Canada
 Order of Canada Citation

1917 births
2007 deaths
People from Světlá nad Sázavou
Canadian classical composers
Czech classical composers
Czech male classical composers
Members of the Order of Canada
Members of the Order of Ontario
University of Toronto alumni
Czechoslovak emigrants to Canada
Juno Award for Classical Composition of the Year winners
20th-century Canadian composers
20th-century Canadian male musicians
Olympic competitors in art competitions